This tournament was a new addition to the ITF Women's Circuit.

Zheng Saisai won the inaugural tournament defeating Jovana Jakšić in the final, 6–2, 6–3.

Seeds

Main draw

Finals

Top half

Bottom half

References 
 Main draw

China International Challenger - Singles